In mathematics, homotopy theory is a systematic study of situations in which maps can come with homotopies between them. It originated as a topic in algebraic topology but nowadays is studied as an independent discipline. Besides algebraic topology, the theory has also been used in other areas of mathematics such as algebraic geometry (e.g., A1 homotopy theory) and category theory (specifically the study of higher categories).

Concepts

Spaces and maps 
In homotopy theory and algebraic topology, the word "space" denotes a topological space. In order to avoid pathologies, one rarely works with arbitrary spaces; instead, one requires spaces to meet extra constraints, such as being compactly generated, or Hausdorff, or a CW complex.

In the same vein as above, a "map" is a continuous function, possibly with some extra constraints.

Often, one works with a pointed space -- that is, a space with a "distinguished point", called a basepoint. A pointed map is then a map which preserves basepoints; that is, it sends the basepoint of the domain to that of the codomain. In contrast, a free map is one which needn't preserve basepoints.

Homotopy 

Let I denote the unit interval. A homotopy can be shown to be an equivalence relation. Given a pointed space X and an integer , let  be the homotopy classes of based maps  from a (pointed) n-sphere  to X. As it turns out,  are groups; in particular,  is called the fundamental group of X.

If one prefers to work with a space instead of a pointed space, there is the notion of a fundamental groupoid (and higher variants): by definition, the fundamental groupoid of a space X is the category where the objects are the points of X and the morphisms are paths.

Cofibration and fibration 
A map  is called a cofibration if given (1) a map  and (2) a homotopy , there exists a homotopy  that extends  and such that . To some loose sense, it is an analog of the defining diagram of an injective module in abstract algebra. The most basic example is a CW pair ; since many work only with CW complexes, the notion of a cofibration is often implicit.

A basic example is a covering map (in fact, a fibration is a generalization of a covering map). If  is a principal G-bundle, that is, a space with a free and transitive (topological) group action of a (topological) group, then the projection map  is an example of a fibration.

Classifying spaces and homotopy operations 
Given a topological group G, the classifying space for principal G-bundles ("the" up to  equivalence) is a space  such that, for each space X,
 {principal G-bundle on X} / ~ 
where
the left-hand side is the set of homotopy classes of maps ,
~ refers isomorphism of bundles, and
Brown's representability theorem guarantees the existence of classifying spaces.

Spectrum and generalized cohomology 

The idea that a classifying space classifies principal bundles can be pushed further. For example, one might try to classify cohomology classes: given an abelian group A (such as ),

where  is the Eilenberg–MacLane space. The above equation leads to the notion of a generalized cohomology theory; i.e., a contravariant functor from the category of spaces to the category of abelian groups that satisfies the axioms generalizing ordinary cohomology theory. As it turns out, such a functor may not be representable by a space but it can always be represented by a sequence of (pointed) spaces with structure maps called a spectrum. In other words, to give a generalized cohomology theory is to give a spectrum.

A basic example of a spectrum is a sphere spectrum:

Key theorems 
Seifert–van Kampen theorem
Homotopy excision theorem
Freudenthal suspension theorem (a corollary of the excision theorem)
Landweber exact functor theorem
Dold–Kan correspondence
Eckmann–Hilton argument - this shows for instance higher homotopy groups are abelian.
Universal coefficient theorem

Obstruction theory and characteristic class 

See also: Characteristic class, Postnikov tower, Whitehead torsion

Localization and completion of a space

Specific theories 
There are several specific theories
simple homotopy theory
stable homotopy theory
chromatic homotopy theory
rational homotopy theory
p-adic homotopy theory
equivariant homotopy theory

Homotopy hypothesis 

One of the basic questions in the foundations of homotopy theory is the nature of a space. The homotopy hypothesis asks whether a space is something fundamentally algebraic.

Abstract homotopy theory

Concepts 
fiber sequence
cofiber sequence

Model categories

Simplicial homotopy theory 
Simplicial homotopy

See also 
Highly structured ring spectrum
Homotopy type theory
Pursuing Stacks

References 
May, J. A Concise Course in Algebraic Topology

Ronald Brown, Topology and groupoids (2006) Booksurge LLC .

Further reading 
Cisinski's notes
http://ncatlab.org/nlab/files/Abstract-Homotopy.pdf
Math 527 - Homotopy Theory Spring 2013, Section F1, lectures by Martin Frankland

External links 
https://ncatlab.org/nlab/show/homotopy+theory